The men's 10,000 metres competition at the 1998 Asian Games in Bangkok, Thailand was held on 13 December at the Thammasat Stadium.

Schedule
All times are Indochina Time (UTC+07:00)

Results
Legend
DSQ — Disqualified

References

External links
Results

Men's 10000 metres
1998